Lindmania oliva-estevae is a plant species in the genus Lindmania. This species is endemic to Venezuela.

References

oliva-estevae
Flora of Venezuela